is a village located in Nagano Prefecture, Japan. , the village had an estimated population of  15,463 in 6115 households, and a population density of 371 persons per km².

Geography
Minamiminowa is located in the Ina Valley of south-central Nagano Prefecture, bordered by the Kiso Mountains to the west. The Tenryū River flows through the village. The village consists of two separate geographic areas, separated from each other by Ina City.

Surrounding municipalities
Nagano Prefecture
 Ina
 Shiojiri
 Minowa
 Tatsuno

Climate
The town has a climate characterized by characterized by hot and humid summers, and cold winters (Köppen climate classification Cfa).  The average annual temperature in Minamiminowa is 11.5 °C. The average annual rainfall is 1370 mm with September as the wettest month. The temperatures are highest on average in August, at around 24.4 °C, and lowest in January, at around -0.8 °C.

Demographics 
Per Japanese census data, the population of Minamiminowa has seen strong growth over the past 60 years.

History
The area of present-day Minaminowa was part of ancient Shinano Province. The village of Minamiminowa was established on April 1, 1889 by the establishment of the modern municipalities system.

Economy
The economy of Minaminowa is based on agriculture, with rice, apples, blueberries and wasabi among the major crops.

Education
Minamiminowa has two public elementary schools and one public middle school operated by the village government, and one high school operated the Nagano Prefectural Board of Education. The village is also host to the Agricultural Department of Shinshu University

Transportation

Railway
 Central Japan Railway Company -  Iida Line
 -

Highway
  Chūō Expressway

References

External links

Official Website 

 
Villages in Nagano Prefecture